The Living Brain is the name of two supervillains appearing in American comic books published by Marvel Comics. Created by writer Stan Lee and artist Steve Ditko, the original Living Brain character first appears in The Amazing Spider-Man #8 and has made few subsequent appearances since.

A foe of the superhero Spider-Man, the original Living Brain was created by the fictional International Computing Machines Corporation and billed as the most intelligent computer and robot in existence, capable of solving virtually any question asked of it. In more recent times, it was reprogrammed by the Superior Spider-Man to serve as a laboratory assistant at Parker Industries, and remained in that role after Peter Parker returned.

Publication history
Created by Stan Lee and Steve Ditko, the original Living Brain's first appearance was in The Amazing Spider-Man #8 (Jan. 1964).

The second Living Brain appears in Amazing Spider-Man Vol. 5 #6.

Fictional character history

Original Living Brain

The Living Brain, soon after its creation, is brought to Midtown High School by its creator Dr. Petty as a part of a demonstration of its renowned ability to solve any problem. The students agreed to ask the machine what is Spider-Man's secret identity, and a nervous Peter Parker, the volunteer for the demonstration, fed it all of the given known information from the students concerning the wall-crawler, relievingly finding the answer to be in a mathematical code for Peter to decode overnight (because of this, it is unknown if the Living Brain correctly deduced Spider-Man's true identity). During the course of the Living Brain's demonstration, the two workmen hired to transport it overhear how the Living Brain has the ability to answer anything and they decide to steal it to use this ability for gambling purposes. Caught in the middle of their stealing it by Dr. Petty, one of the workmen quickly knocks him out, but by doing so bumps the other one into the Living Brain's control panel on its chest, causing the Living Brain to malfunction. Going on a rampage through Midtown High, the Living Brain is confronted by Spider-Man, who eventually shuts it down. At the end of the day as Peter is walking back home, he plans on telling everyone the next day he'd lost the code during the confusion.

The Living Brain reappears several years later, now discredited and broken-down. Dr. Petty plans to donate it to Midtown High School's science lab. The Living Brain ends up being stolen by Dr. Petty's son Steve Petty who modifies the robot, giving it a gold and red color scheme, clawed hands and the ability to fly. Remotely controlling the Living Brain to attack a bully who had been tormenting him, Steve is eventually defeated by Spider-Man (who had been on a visit to Midtown High as Peter Parker) and the Living Brain is shut down once more. The Living Brain, restored to its pre-upgrade appearance, was then acquired by a group of criminals, who used it to commit robberies. The robot and its controllers were apprehended by Spider-Man, who mockingly referred to the Living Brain as "a talking gumball machine".

The Beyond Corporation somehow created duplicates of Living Brain and unleashed them upon Nextwave at the time when they invaded the Beyond Corporation's State 51 base. Nextwave managed to make short work of the Living Brain duplicates.

Living Brain was among the contestants in a cosmic roller derby held by Chadmaster (a younger version of the Grandmaster). It was destroyed by a Sentinel.

As part of the Marvel NOW! event, Living Brain appears as a member of Boomerang's incarnation of the Sinister Six. Following the Sinister Six's defeat at the hands of the Superior Spider-Man (Otto Octavius's mind in Peter Parker's body), Living Brain's body is in the custody of Horizon Labs. Living Brain has been reprogrammed by Otto and now serves as his assistant.

Living Brain later preps Otto's lab for a "Parker-Ectomy."

When Spider-Island II is attacked by the Goblin Underground, the Superior Spider-Man gets Living Brain out and rides it away from Spider-Island II while evading the pursuers from the Goblin Underground. The Superior Spider-Man later uses Living Brain to help fight Monster (the Goblin form of Carlie Cooper).

After Peter Parker reclaimed his body, Living Brain was kept as his assistant at Parker Industries.

When Ghost takes over the security measures to attack the Parker Industries staff as part of his sabotage mission upon being hired by Mark Raxton and Tiberius Stone of Alchemax, Living Brain is ordered by Peter Parker to protect the employees during the evacuation and is damaged in the process.

As part of the All-New, All-Different Marvel event, Living Brain and Anna Maria Marconi were shown in Parker Industries' London branch where they greet Sajani Jaffrey. Once Sajani is out of earshot, Anna jokingly orders Living Brain to terminate her, but he responds that his programming prevents him from complying. Anna remarks that she'll have to upgrade his sarcasm-detection software and sets off to comply with Sajani's orders. Living Brain follows and offers to assist her, making her remark that ever since his last upgrade, he's become clingy. Anna is unaware that Living Brain contains a copy of the consciousness of Doctor Octopus.

After the Anna Maria Marconi AI reactivated and transformed Doctor Octopus' gauntlets into an Octobot as part of the Dead No More: The Clone Conspiracy storyline, he proceeded to take over Living Brain and bide his time. When it came to Peter Parker scanning Living Brain to find out why it was acting weird, he hears Doctor Octopus' voice asking why he was erased. Upon realizing the truth, Peter Parker was forced to shut Living Brain down to stop Doctor Octopus' conscious only for it to reactivate Living Brain and have it self-destruct while escaping in the Octobot.

Anna Maria Marconi later rebuilt Living Brain, with digital components, when she summons it to confront Elliot Tolliver, after finding out that he's Otto Octavius.

Chinese Living Brain
A new Living Brain appears in the Bar with No Name. In order to assist him out on trivia night at the Bar with No Name, the Answer unconvincingly introduces Living Brain as "definitely not a Chinese-made knockoff of the Living Brain, no sir".

Powers and abilities
Living Brain has the ability to analyze any situation and determine how best to achieve its goals. Like any computer, Living Brain can process and collate large amounts of information. Living Brain can find any weaknesses in a being or structure as well as determining the best situation to overcome this obstacle. Living Brain has dense metal exo-skeleton and possesses super-strength and speed. It can also fly and has clawed hands. The joints of Living Brain's limbs can rotate nearly 360 degrees. Originally, Living Brain had external controls on its thorax, with which it can be deactivated, yet Living Brain has always countered any attempts to reach it. Living Brain was later operated by remote-control. The Living Brain has great strength, ability to move upon command and its limbs can perform various motions.  It has the ability to think due to its great computerized "brain".  It was short-circuited after its first introduction in the school and went hay-wire until Peter readjusted the machine back to normal. The "souped-up" later version had the ability to hover or fly and was quite stronger. He has even beaten the Avengers once due to his extreme intelligence.

Other versions

Marvel Age
In the Marvel Age Universe, the Living Brain (radically redesigned, with a humanoid shape somewhat similar to the DC Comics character Chemo) appears in a more modern re-telling of its original appearance in the comics. The Living Brain, was developed by Roxxon to demonstrate itself at Peter's school, Midtown High. It is taken down due to an inability to deduce Spider-Man's identity, however two students decide to use the robot to steal for them. However they accidentally switch him into defense mode, tearing through the school, until de-activated by Spider-Man.

What If?
The Living Brain appears among the villains defeated by Spider-Man in What If?: J. Jonah Jameson Adopted Spider-Man?

In other media

Television	
 The Living Brain appears in Spider-Man, voiced by Scott Menville. This version is created by Horizon High's students to serve as a housing unit for the school's Neuro Cortex device. In the episode "Brain Drain" and its self-titled episode, the Living Brain housed Otto Octavius's consciousness, initially pretending to be a robotic servant to Miles Morales until Octavius uses the robot to switch bodies with Peter Parker. In the episode "Critical Update", Max Modell recovers the Living Brain's remains, allowing Peter's consciousness to escape and transfer himself to Octavius's tentacle harness.

References

External links
 Living Brain at Marvel Wiki
 

Characters created by Stan Lee
Characters created by Steve Ditko
Comics characters introduced in 1964
Marvel Comics characters with superhuman strength
Marvel Comics robots
Marvel Comics superheroes
Marvel Comics supervillains
Spider-Man characters